One Street Organ, One Life or Mia laterna, Mia Zoi is a 1958 Greek film directed by Sokrates Kapsaskis and written by Yorgos Javellas. It stars Orestis Makris, Jenny Karezi, Petros Fyssoun, Dinos Iliopoulos, Nitsa Tsaganea and Lavrentis Dianellos. The film is about a street musician who loses his wife during childbirth and puts his baby daughter up for adoption, but comes to bitterly regret it.

References

External links
 

1958 films
1950s Greek-language films
Greek drama films
1958 drama films